The Bank of Lafourche Building, also known as the Oil & Gas Building, is a historic commercial building located at 206 Green Street in Thibodaux, Louisiana.

Built in 1897, the building is a two-story brick Italianate style commercial building with marble facade. It was used as a bank until 1929.

The building was listed on the National Register of Historic Places on March 5, 1986.

It is one of 14 individually NRHP-listed properties in the "Thibodaux Multiple Resource Area", which also includes:

Breaux House
Building at 108 Green Street
Chanticleer Gift Shop
Citizens Bank of Lafourche
Grand Theatre
Lamartina Building
McCulla House
Peltier House
Percy-Lobdell Building
Riviere Building
Riviere House
Robichaux House
St. Joseph Co-Cathedral and Rectory

See also
 National Register of Historic Places listings in Lafourche Parish, Louisiana

References

Bank buildings on the National Register of Historic Places in Louisiana
Italianate architecture in Louisiana
Commercial buildings completed in 1897
Lafourche Parish, Louisiana
National Register of Historic Places in Lafourche Parish, Louisiana